The Communist Party of Chile is a communist party in Chile. It was founded in 1912 as the Socialist Workers' Party and adopted its current name in 1922. The party established a youth wing, the Communist Youth of Chile (JJ.CC), in 1932.

History

The PCCh was founded on 4 June 1912 by Luis Emilio Recabarren, after he left the Democrat Party. The party was initially known as the Socialist Workers' Party, before adopting its current name on 2 January 1922.

It achieved congressional representation shortly thereafter and played a leading role in the development of the Chilean labor movement. Closely tied to the Soviet Union and the Third International, the PCCh participated in the Popular Front (Frente Popular) government of 1938, growing rapidly among the unionized working class in the 1940s. It then participated to the Popular Front's successor, the Democratic Alliance.

Concern over the PCCh's success at building a strong electoral base, combined with the onset of the Cold War, led to its being outlawed in 1948 by a Radical government, a status it had to endure for almost a decade until 1958 when it was again legalized. By the 1960s, the party had become a veritable political subculture, with its own symbols and organizations and the support of prominent artists and intellectuals such as Pablo Neruda, the Nobel Prize-winning poet, and Violeta Parra, the songwriter and folk artist.
At the time, the U.S. State Department estimated the party membership to be approximately 27,500.

It later came to power along with the Socialist Party in the Unidad Popular ("Popular Unity") coalition in 1970. Within the broad Unidad Popular alliance, the communists sided with Allende, a relative moderate from the Socialist Party, and other more moderate forces of that coalition, supporting more gradual reforms and urging to find a compromise with the Christian Democrats. This line was opposed by more radically leftist factions of the Socialist Party and smaller far-left groups. The party was outlawed after the 1973 coup d'état that deposed President Salvador Allende. Much of the Communist leadership went underground, and for a while the party's moderation continued even after the coup had taken place. Also, it has been argued by Mark Ensalaco that crushing the Communist Party was not a top priority for the military junta. In its first statement after the coup, the party leadership still argued that the coup could succeed because the Unidad Popular was too isolated, due to actions of the 'far-left'. Around 1977, the party changed direction. The Communist Party set up a guerrilla organization, the Manuel Rodríguez Patriotic Front. With the restoration of democracy and the election of a new president in 1990, the Communist Party of Chile was legalized again.

As part of the Popular Unity coalition the PCCh advocated a broad alliance; however, it swung sharply to the left after the 1973 coup, regretting the failure to issue arms to the working class and pursuing an armed struggle against Pinochet's regime. Since the restoration of democracy it has acted independently of its previous partners. Between 1983 and 1987 it was a member of the People's Democratic Movement.

In the 1999/2000 presidential elections the party supported Gladys Marín Millie for the national presidential elections. She won 3.2% of the vote in the first round.
At the 2005 legislative election, 11 December 2005, the party won 5.1% of the popular vote, but as a result of Chile's binomial electoral rules, no seats. The small but significant support of the PCCh is believed to have aided in the electoral victories of former socialist president Ricardo Lagos in the 2000 elections, and in the more recent victory of Chile's first female president, the socialist Michelle Bachelet in January 2006, both of whom won in competitive second round runoffs.

From 2013 to 2018, the PCCh was a member of New Majority, a leftist coalition led by Michelle Bachelet.

Controversies
The PCCh faced criticism from several parties in Chile after congratulating Venezuelan president Nicolás Maduro on his party's victory in the 2020 parliamentary election. Prominent members of the Party for Democracy, Radical Party, and Socialist Party questioned the PCCh's praise of the election as "flawless", echoing criticisms from opposition parties in Venezuela that the election was neither free nor fair.

Leaders

Electoral performance
Keys
 RP = supported a candidate from the Radical Party
 SP = supported a candidate from the Socialist Party
 PU–SP = member of the Popular Unity coalition, supported the candidate from the Socialist Party
 PDC = supported a candidate from the Christian Democratic Party
 Ind = supported an independent candidate
 HP = supported a candidate from the Humanist Party
 NM–SP = member of the New Majority coalition, supported the candidate from the Socialist Party
 NM–Ind = member of the New Majority coalition, supported an independent candidate
 AD-SC = member of the Apruebo Dignidad coalition, supported the candidate from Social Convergence

See also
Communist Youth of Chile
Luis Emilio Recabarren
Popular Unity
Co-ordinating Committee of Communist Parties in Britain
Juntos PODEMOS Más
Norte Grande insurrection

Footnotes

Further reading
 Olga Ulianova and Alfredo Riquelme (eds.), Chile en los archivos soviéticos: 1922–1991: Tomo I, Komintern y Chile, 1922–1931 (Chile in the Soviet Archives: Volume 1, Comintern and Chile, 1922–1931). Santiago: Centro de Investigaciones Diego Barros Arana, Lom Ediciones, 2005.
 Olga Ulianova and Alfredo Riquelme (eds.), Chile en los archivos soviéticos: 1922–1991: Tomo II, Komintern y Chile, 1931–1935 (Chile in the Soviet Archives: Volume 2, Comintern and Chile, 1931–1935). Santiago: Centro de Investigaciones Diego Barros Arana, Lom Ediciones, 2009.

External links

  

 
1912 establishments in Chile
Communist parties in Chile
Left-wing politics in Chile
Left-wing populism in South America
Political parties established in 1912
Populist parties
International Meeting of Communist and Workers Parties